Soibam Subhaschandra Singh is an Indian politician from Manipur. In March 2017, he was elected as a member of the Manipur Legislative Assembly from Naoriya Pakhanglakpa (constituency) as a member of Bharatiya Janata Party. He defeated R. K. Anand of Indian National Congress by 1,615 votes in 2017 Manipur Assembly election. He was one of three MLA's who resigned from Bharatiya Janata Party and joined the Indian National Congress in June 2020.

References 

Living people
Year of birth missing (living people)
21st-century Indian politicians
People from Imphal West district
Bharatiya Janata Party politicians from Manipur
Manipur MLAs 2017–2022